Olga Aleksandrovna Shtyrenko (born 6 July 1977 in Volgograd, Soviet Union) is a Russian retired rhythmic gymnast. She won a bronze medal in the group competition at the 1996 Summer Olympics in Atlanta.

References
 

1977 births
Living people
Russian rhythmic gymnasts
Gymnasts at the 1996 Summer Olympics
Olympic gymnasts of Russia
Olympic bronze medalists for Russia
Olympic medalists in gymnastics
Sportspeople from Volgograd
Medalists at the 1996 Summer Olympics